Charybdis Cove is the 1.2 km wide cove indenting for 580 m the northwest coast of Varna Peninsula, Livingston Island in the South Shetland Islands, Antarctica and entered between Organpipe Point to the north and Slab Point to the south.

The feature is named after the Charybdis, a mythical Greek sea monster which wrecked ships and devoured sailors.

Location

Maps
 L.L. Ivanov et al. Antarctica: Livingston Island and Greenwich Island, South Shetland Islands. Scale 1:100000 topographic map. Sofia: Antarctic Place-names Commission of Bulgaria, 2005.
 L.L. Ivanov. Antarctica: Livingston Island and Greenwich, Robert, Snow and Smith Islands. Scale 1:120000 topographic map.  Troyan: Manfred Wörner Foundation, 2009.

References
Composite Antarctic Gazetteer.

Coves of Livingston Island